The South African Air Force (SAAF) adopted the use of squadron codes from the Royal Air Force (RAF) during the Second World War.

The SAAF continued to use these codes after the war, with the final use of the wartime code system on a 22 Squadron PV-1 Ventura in 1960.

Aircraft deployed for the East African Campaign did not carry any squadron codes—these were first introduced when the SAAF deployed to North Africa in 1942.  Squadron codes were assigned by the RAF from a theater annex to SD110.  Aircraft used in South Africa did not carry squadron codes, except for aircraft of the 11 OTU which carried the squadron codes of their parent squadrons (1 and 2 Squadron SAAF).

Historically, the codes were usually two alphabetic characters, painted on the rear fuselage next to the roundel. These formed a suffix or prefix to the call sign of each aircraft (on the other side of the roundel) which was usually a single letter (e. g. "G for George"). In general, when an aircraft was lost or withdrawn from use, its call sign was applied to its replacement or another aircraft.

World War II

Post war use of wartime code system

References

South African Air Force
Aircraft markings